Hale Knight Darling (January 26, 1869 – September 18, 1940) was a Vermont attorney and politician who served as the state's 50th lieutenant governor from 1915 to 1917.

Biography
Hale Knight Darling was born in Corinth, Vermont on January 26, 1869.  He was employed in Massachusetts by the Fitchburg Railroad and worked as a reporter on the Fitchburg Daily Sentinel before studying law at the University of North Carolina.  He was admitted to the bar in 1894, and established a practice in Chelsea, Vermont.

A Republican, Darling was Orange County State's Attorney from 1896 to 1900, a member of the Vermont Board of Bar Examiners from 1901 to 1903, and Clerk of the Orange County Court from 1905 to 1921.

Darling served in the Vermont House of Representatives from 1904 to 1908. In 1905 he was appointed Chairman of the Vermont Library Commission, and from 1905 to 1907 he was a member of the Commission to revise Vermont's Statutes. He served in the Vermont Senate from 1912 to 1914.

In 1914 he was elected Lieutenant Governor and served from 1915 to 1917, also serving again as a member of the Commission to Revise Vermont's Statutes.

Darling served in the Vermont Senate again from 1919 to 1921.  In 1937 he was Chairman of a commission that reviewed and recommended reforms of Vermont's court system.

Darling died in Chelsea on September 18, 1940. He was buried in Chelsea's Highland Cemetery.

Family
In 1896, Darling married Maybelle Maud Hyde; they were the parents of four children who lived to adulthood.

References 

1869 births
1940 deaths
Vermont lawyers
State's attorneys in Vermont
Republican Party members of the Vermont House of Representatives
Republican Party Vermont state senators
Lieutenant Governors of Vermont
People from Corinth, Vermont
University of North Carolina School of Law alumni
Burials in Vermont